The 1989 FIS Freestyle World Ski Championships were held between March 1st and March 5th at the Oberjoch ski resort in then-West Germany. The World Championships featured both men's and women's events in the Moguls, Aerials, Acro Skiing and the Combined.

Results

Men's results

Moguls

Aerials

Acro Skiing

Combined

Women's results

Moguls

Aerials

Acro Skiing

Combined

References

External links
 FIS Freestyle Skiing Home
 Results from the FIS

1989
1989 in West German sport
1989 in freestyle skiing
Freestyle skiing competitions in Germany